Sayyid Ali was the 41st imam of the Qasim-Shahi branch of the Nizari Isma'ili community.

Sayyid Ali succeeded his father Shah Nizar II when the latter died in September 1722. Like his father, he resided at Kahak in central Persia, where he died in 1754.

He was buried in his father's mausoleum in Kahak; his tomb is located in the largest of the mausoleum's chambers. His son Sayyid Hasan Ali succeeded him.

References

Sources

 

1754 deaths
Nizari imams
18th-century Iranian people
Iranian Ismailis
18th-century Ismailis
18th-century Islamic religious leaders
People from Markazi Province